Sultan Reedy National Park,  Sultan Marshes, established on March 17, 2006, is a national park in central Turkey. It is located around Lake Yay between the Yeşilhisar, Develi and Yahyalı districts of Kayseri Province. It was designated a Ramsar site on July 13, 1994. 	

Gallery

References

National parks of Turkey
Geography of Kayseri Province
Landforms of Kayseri Province
Tourist attractions in Kayseri Province
Yeşilhisar District
Develi District
Yahyalı District
2006 establishments in Turkey
Protected areas established in 2006
Ramsar sites in Turkey
Important Bird Areas of Turkey